Bengt Harding Olson (21 March 1937 – 14 October 2018) was a Swedish politician who served as an MP from 1985 to 1998.

References

1937 births
2018 deaths
20th-century Swedish politicians
Members of the Riksdag from the Liberals (Sweden)
People from Ljungby Municipality